Camille Lucie Nickerson (March 30, 1888 – April 27, 1982) was an American pianist, composer, arranger, collector, and Howard University professor from 1926 to 1962. She was influenced by Creole folksongs of Louisiana, which she arranged and sang.

Early life and education 
Nickerson was born in the French Quarter of New Orleans, the daughter of music professor and band director William Joseph Nickerson and his first wife, Aurelie Duconge. She was a member of her father's musical ensemble, the Nickerson Ladies’ Orchestra, from an early age. She earned a bachelor's degree in 1916 and a master's degree in 1932 at the Oberlin Conservatory of Music. She continued her studies with support from a Rosenwald Fellowship. Her master's thesis at Oberlin was titled "Afro-Creole Music in Louisiana: A Thesis on the Plantation Songs Created by the Creole Negroes of Louisiana."

She made further studies on a sabbatical in 1939 and 1940, at Columbia University and the Juilliard School.

Career 
Nickerson taught at her father's school in New Orleans as a young woman, and played organ and piano recitals in Black churches. She was a professor of music at Howard University from 1926 to 1962. As a music scholar, she researched folksongs and collected Creole songs, creating her own arrangements of songs including Michieu banjo and Lizette, to quitte la plaine.

During the 1930s and into the 1950s she toured the United States as "The Louisiana Lady", singing creole songs and dressed in a series of ruffled gowns to evoke New Orleans history.  She was a featured performer in the Negro Exhibits Building at the Texas Centennial Exposition in 1936. She toured France as a cultural relations representative in 1954, sponsored by the U.S. Information Agency (USIA); her success on radio and stage in France was helped by her fluent French.

From 1935 to 1938, Nickerson was president of the National Association of Negro Musicians. She was an officer of the organization as early as 1925. She was a member of Delta Sigma Theta. Some of her arrangements were published as Five Creole Songs Harmonized and Arranged by Camille Nickerson (1942).

Personal life and legacy 
Nickerson died in Washington, D.C. in 1982, aged 94 years. Her papers were donated to Howard University. Tulane University's Hogan Jazz Archive holds some papers from Nickerson's New Orleans years.

References

Further reading 
 Anderson, Ruth E. Contemporary American Composers: A Biographical Dictionary. Boston: G.K Hall, 1976
Smith, Jessie Carey, ed. Notable Black Women. Detroit, MI: Gale Research Inc., 1992
Southern, Eileen. Biographical Dictionary of Afro-American Women and African Musicians. Westport, CT: Greenwood Press, 1982

External links
Louisiana Leaders: Notable Women in History: Camille Nickerson
Southern, Eileen. The Music of Black Americans: A History. W. W. Norton & Company; 3rd edition. 

American women composers
American composers
1888 births
1982 deaths
Oberlin College alumni
Juilliard School alumni
Columbia University alumni
Howard University faculty
Musicians from New Orleans
20th-century American women musicians
American women academics
African-American women musicians
20th-century African-American women
20th-century African-American people
20th-century African-American musicians